Burnaz Atike Sultan ("proof" and "the free one" or "the generous one";  1614?, Topkapi Palace, Constantinople - 1674, Constantinople) was an Ottoman princess, daughter of Sultan Ahmed I.

Materhood
Atike Sultan was born in Constantinople, in the Topkapi Palace, probably around 1614. Her father was the Ottoman Sultan Ahmed I.

The identity of her mother is controversial, due to the inaccuracy of her date of birth: she could be a daughter of Kösem Sultan and twin of Şehzade Kasim or one of her other children, or be born of an unknown concubine.

The first hypothesis is supported by evidence of a particular closeness between Atike, Kösem, and her youngest son, Ibrahim (the future Ibrahim I). Not only did Atike give as a gift to Ibrahim and Kösem, the future Turhan Sultan, first Haseki of Ibrahim and mother of Mehmed IV, but she also was buried inside Ibrahim's mausoleum rather, than that of her father, which is unusual for a princess daughter and sister of a sultan and even more so if a half-sister.

Life
After the death of her father in 1617, she resided in the Old Palace with her sisters and half-sisters, her mother and the other concubine mothers of children of the late sultan. until her first marriage, if she was the daughter of a concubine, or until the ascent to the throne of her brother Murad IV in 1623, if she was the daughter of Kösem.

Atike Sultan's first marriage was to Musahıp Cafer Pasha (died 1647), most probably in 1633. Upon the death of her husband, she was married to Koca Kenan Pasha in 1648. After he in turn died in 1652, she was married to Doğancı Yusuf Pasha that same year. He died in 1670.

It is unknown if she had children by these marriages, however she was the "spiritual mother" of the future Mihnea III of Wallachia and she cared for him while he stayed at Constantinople.

Turhan Sultan, first Haseki Sultan of Ibrahim I, and the mother of Mehmed IV, who had been a gift from Atike to Valide Kösem Sultan, had been trained by Atike herself. She was called Turhan's and Mehmed IV's “governess” and she cared for them as if she was her mother and his grandmother.

Death
Atike Sultan died in 1674. She is buried in her brother's, or half brother's, Ibrahim's mausoleum, in Hagia Sophia, Istanbul.

In popular culture
In the Turkish TV series Muhteşem Yüzyıl: Kösem, Atike Sultan is portrayed by Turkish actress Ece Çeşmioğlu. She is represented here as the youngest daughter of Ahmed I and Kösem Sultan and twin of Ibrahim I.

See also
 List of Ottoman Princesses

References

Sources

17th-century Ottoman princesses